USS S-2 (SS-106) was the prototype of the "Lake-type" S-class submarine of the United States Navy. ( was the "Holland-type" prototype and  the "Government-type".) Her keel was laid down on 30 July 1917 by the Lake Torpedo Boat Company in Bridgeport, Connecticut. She was launched on 15 February 1919 sponsored by Mrs. Philip B. Brill, and commissioned on 25 May 1920.

After trials and outfitting, S-2 rendezvoused off Portsmouth, New Hampshire on 22 July 1921 with members of Submarine Divisions 18 and 12 (SubDivs 18 and 12), for what was — at that time — the longest cruise on record for American submarines. They sailed via the Panama Canal to Pearl Harbor and then on to Cavite, Luzon, Philippines. Submarines which had previously served in the Asiatic Fleet had been carried over, tied to the decks of colliers.

The two divisions operated from the Cavite Naval Station during the three years following their arrival on 1 December 1921. They frequently visited Chinese ports at Shanghai, Chefoo, Chinwangtao, Tsingtao, Amoy, and Woosung during this period. On 29 October 1924, Far East duty was terminated for the divisions and they departed for the west coast of the United States. S-2, however, remained behind. On 5 November, her status was reduced to, in commission, in reserve. Retaining a partial crew for maintenance and readiness, she remained in reserve until 5 May 1928, when she again was commissioned in full.

S-2 spent the rest of May, June, and July in China, then resumed operations in the Philippines which she continued until ordered to return to Philadelphia, Pennsylvania, for inactivation. She departed Manila on 27 April 1929 and sailed via Guam, Pearl Harbor, California, and the Panama Canal to the Naval Shipyard at Philadelphia, Pennsylvania. Arriving on 5 August, S-2 was decommissioned there on 25 November. After being stripped, she was struck from the Naval Vessel Register in 1931 and sold on 14 September of that year.

References

Ships built in Bridgeport, Connecticut
United States S-class submarines
1919 ships